The Association Internationale des Maires Francophones (est. 1979) is an international organization of mayors of cities in French-speaking countries, headquartered in Paris.

Presidents
 Jacques Chirac, 1979-1995 
 Jean Tiberi, 1995-2001
 Bertrand Delanoë, 2001-2014 
 Anne Hidalgo, 2014-present

Assemblée générale 
The association holds annual meetings.

See also
 Organisation internationale de la Francophonie
 United States Conference of Mayors

References

External links 
 Official site
 OCLC WorldCat. Association internationale des maires et responsables des capitales et métropoles partiellement ou entièrement francophones
 

Organizations based in Paris
Organizations established in 1979
International political organizations
1979 establishments in France